{{Infobox game
| title         = Middle Earth Strategy Battle  Game| italic title = yes
| image_link    = 
| image_caption = The cover of The Lord of the Rings Strategy Battle Game rulebook
| manufacturer  = Games Workshop
| publisher     = Games Workshop
| years         = 2001–present
| genre         = Wargaming
| players       = 2+
| setup_time    = 5–10 minutes (depending on size of game)
| playing_time  = Approximately 2.5 hours per 500 points of miniatures
| random_chance = Medium (dice rolling)
| skills        = Military strategy, arithmetic
| web           = www.games-workshop.com
| footnotes     = Game length varies according to battle size, while rules complexity can vary by army.
}}Middle Earth Strategy Battle  Game, previously marketed as The Hobbit: An Unexpected Journey Strategy Battle Game, The Hobbit: The Desolation of Smaug Strategy Battle Game, The Hobbit: The Battle of Five Armies Strategy Battle Game and The Lord of the Rings Strategy Battle Game, is a tabletop miniature wargame produced by Games Workshop. It is based on The Lord of the Rings film trilogy directed by Peter Jackson, and the book that inspired it, written by J. R. R. Tolkien.

The game was initially released in 2001 to coincide in with the film The Fellowship of the Ring.  New box sets with updated rules were also released for The Two Towers and The Return of the King films. Later, beginning with the Shadow and Flame supplement, Games Workshop began to add content that was featured in the original book but not in the film adaptations: e.g. Tom Bombadil, Radagast and Glorfindel.  Games Workshop has also expanded its licence with original material on areas such as Harad and Khand, with mixed reactions.  Another complete edition of the rules, often called The One Rulebook to Rule them All, was released by Games Workshop in September 2005, while a compact edition entitled The Mines of Moria was also released. This was superseded by a new rule book in 2018, called simply  Middle-earth Strategy Battle Game Rules Manual. This new rule book combined the original LotR SBG and Hobbit SBG into one cohesive, cross compatible rule set.
 
In early 2009, Games Workshop also released an expansion to the original game called War of the Ring which, according to the company, allows players to emulate the large battles included in J. R. R. Tolkien's The Lord of the Rings by streamlining the game system. This expansion differs from the main game in several ways. Firstly, War of the Ring uses a larger number of models but the models are placed on movement trays with two cavalry models or eight infantry models on each. This allows for much easier and quicker movement of large numbers of models at once. These are called "companies". Larger creatures such as Ents and Trolls are treated as separate models and do not use movement trays. Combat within the game is also treated differently. In the original game players both roll dice to determine who wins the fight and then the victor rolls to see how much damage is done. In War of the Ring only dice to determine damage are rolled. Also, in War of the Ring, heroes are treated more like upgrades for their company rather than individual models, as they are in the original game.
 
In addition to gaming, The Lord of the Rings Strategy Battle Game includes other common elements of the miniature wargaming hobby.  These include the collecting, painting and conversion of miniature figures used in play, as well as the modelling of gaming terrain from scratch.  These aspects of the hobby are covered in Games Workshop's monthly White Dwarf and on various gaming websites, as well as formerly in the fortnightly Battle Games in Middle-earth.

In 2015 Forge World, a division of Games Workshop focused on specialist resin miniatures and conversion kits as well as the Specialist Games ranges, assumed production of The Lord of the Rings Strategy Battle Game''' and all supplements.

Development

Background
In the 1980s, Games Workshop produced a range of miniatures for The Lord of the Rings, using original character designs based on fantasy art popular of the time.  This was the first range of Lord of the Rings miniatures that Citadel created, taking over from Grenadier Miniatures in 1985, before the licence passed to Mithril Miniatures around 1987.  The earliest releases were semi-solid base, having a small solid base; later releases were slot based.

Current licensing
The current Lord of the Rings range stems from Games Workshop's rights to produce a skirmish war game based on The Lord of the Rings and The Hobbit books and films, in the 25mm miniature scale. (The rights to produce a role playing game version of the films were sold to another firm, Decipher, Inc.) They also have the rights to produce Battle of Five Armies, a game based on the battle of similar name from The Hobbit, using smaller miniatures to enact larger battles (more akin to the Warmaster system). Under this separate licence,  the game was done using a 10 mm scale for the normal warriors, and a larger "heroic" scale for the named characters.

Games Workshop has not acquired the rights to The Silmarillion, which is still the exclusive property of the Tolkien Estate, but has the right to develop its own derivative intellectual property to fill in the gaps in The Lord of the Rings universe.  This is particularly true of Harad, which has a range of invented places (such as "Kârna", "Badharkân", "Hidâr", "Nâfarat", "Abrakân", and "Dhâran-sar") and characters (such as the Hasharin and "Dalamyr, Fleetmaster of Umbar").

Designers and Peter Jackson
Four of the game's designers were in the extended Return of the King film as Rohirrim at the Battle of the Pelennor Fields: Alessio Cavatore, Brian Nelson, and Alan and Michael Perry. They can be seen near the Oliphaunt when Peregrin Took goes searching for Meriadoc Brandybuck among the debris from the battle, and are also on the base of Games Workshop's Mûmak miniature. Games Workshop created two miniatures of Peter Jackson, based on his appearance as a Breeland man during the Fellowship of the Ring: one is owned by the director, and the other is kept on display at Warhammer World in England. Games Workshop has also released a model of Peter Jackson as one of the Corsairs of Umbar from The Return of the King.

Hobbyist community

Collectors
Similar to Warhammer Fantasy Battle players, Lord of the Rings players commonly collect and paint one army (or more) of their choice and find opponents (with similarly collected armies) to play against. Armies can be built up from through the purchase of boxed sets (usually having 10 or 12 plastic miniatures in each) or "blister packs" (usually containing no more than four finely detailed metal or resin miniatures) to build up a reasonable-sized fighting force. Others simply collect the miniatures because they like the way they look. One popular way of collecting was through Battle Games in Middle-earth — a De Agostini magazine that came with one or more free miniatures (some of which were initially exclusive to the publication) and contained detailed hobby guides.

As such, there are a wide variety of miniatures in the ever-growing range, including promotional miniatures, such as "Gimli on Dead Uruk-hai". Games Workshop began to discontinue some of their metal miniatures, so that they could replace them with plastic miniatures. However, there was much complaint when they retired the popular "Boromir Captain of the White Tower" miniature, and it was later brought back into production.

There are a large number of differences from Warhammer in The Lord of the Rings Strategy Battle Game, which makes it unique and more realistic, accounting for its popularity as Games Workshop's third core system.

Modellers

Since the models are hand-painted and assembled by the player, players are often encouraged to design their own paint schemes, such as colouring them differently and so on, as well as using the pre-designed ones displayed in the various books. They are also encouraged to further modify their miniatures using parts from other kits and models (known as "Bitz" to players), modelling putty, or whatever the modeller can scrounge up. These conversions are often entered into contests at sponsored tournaments and similar gaming events, such as the Golden Demon or the One Ring Awards.

Terrain is a very important part of play. Though Games Workshop makes terrain kits available, many hobbyists prefer to make their own elaborate and unique set pieces. Common household items and hobby materials such as balsa wood, cardboard, and polystyrene can be transformed into ruins from the Second Age, woodland terrain, or the rocky wild of Middle-earth with the addition of plastic card, putty, and a bit of patience and skill.

Dioramas, often depicting scenes from the film and books, bring terrain and conversion skills together. However, due to the licensing agreements between New Line Cinema and Games Workshop, pieces of models for the Lord of the Rings Strategy Battle Game are not allowed to be combined with other model lines for official tournaments or conversion awards. The same is true for pieces from other manufacturers.

Current state of play

History and overview of rulesets

, the rules for the Lord of the Rings Strategy Battle Game were in their fourth edition. The first three editions of the rulebooks were released with The Lord of the Rings films, but Games Workshop used the magazine White Dwarf and various supplements to "go beyond what is presented in the films of The Lord of the Rings and delve into the rich material of J. R. R. Tolkien's books." The fourth edition, The One Rulebook to Rule them All, contained the entire set of rules updated and presented in a single large volume, including those of previous supplements. The three older editions were re-released in updated supplements, while the compact Mines of Moria edition contains the updated rules only for what was shown in the films. In February 2012, preceding the release of The Hobbit movies,  all of the characteristic profiles from the old sourcebooks and White Dwarf were condensed in 5 sourcebooks: Mordor, The Fallen Realms, Moria & Angmar, Kingdoms of Men, and The Free Peoples. These also contain minor edits to the rules as written in The One Rulebook to Rule them All. For around a decade, this remained the core rules system, with only minor changes through various supplements.

With the release of The Hobbit trilogy of films, the game was rebranded, a new rulebook with various changes was released, and supplements tying in to each of the films were released. The Hobbit theme performed less well than expected, reaching nowhere near the peak popularity seen during the original Lord of the Rings trilogy release, when the game had been Games Workshop's most valuable property. The game gradually received less and less attention from Games Workshop as profits and interest dwindled.

After this period of decline, Games Workshop unexpectedly announced a revival of the game. A third rebrand, to no longer focus on The Hobbit, took place. The rules were reworked and republished in a new edition in 2018 (effectively the 5th edition), and all the profiles of all models were revised and collected in two books: Armies of The Lord of the Rings and Armies of The Hobbit, uniting the older and newer ranges of miniatures into the same system. A new starter box set, based on the climactic Battle of Pelennor Fields from The Return of the King, was designed and heavily promoted. This ushered in a new era for the game, with further, scenario-focused supplements following, significantly increased interest in the game, greater coverage of the game by Games Workshop, and cyclical rereleases of out-of-production miniatures. As of 2022, the revived form of the game is healthy and well-supported, though remains niche in comparison to Games Workshop's titans of Warhammer and Warhammer 40,000.

Below is a list of all official editions of rulebooks and supplements released:

For materials done under the previous iteration of the rules, there exist errata and FAQ files, to ensure potential rules conflicts between editions are resolved universally.

In addition to the official rulesets, Games Workshop has also encouraged the writing of unofficial "house rules" by wargamers. As such, there have been a number of unofficial fan supplements and other supplementary material on the internet; the most notable of which was The Age of the King, made by The One Ring. Although some of its subject matter was later covered by official rulesets, it is still considered "the benchmark against which all others are measured". In many cases, supplements are written for areas where Games Workshop's licence does not extend, such as The Silmarillion.

Legions of Middle-earth
, Games Workshop released a new expansion entitled Legions of Middle-earth, centering on theming and army building.  It is not a supplement or rulebook, as it contains no rules; instead, it provides army lists for players to theme their forces around, and scenarios which are designed to work in conjunction with them. However, Games Workshop also released supplement summaries online in conjunction with Legions of Middle-earth, so effectively a player only requires Legions of Middle-earth and the main rulebook in order to use the rules of the supplements.With the exception that the summaries do give access to a model's basic wargear, available "Magic" or the Movement rate. According to one review, the army lists would transform the game "from what has essentially been a scenario-based game that appealed mostly to collectors to a genuine tournament-compatible game system," although in this it "could have been a little bit more restrictive." Some of the miniatures for the point values listed have not yet been released; in this way, the book was not to become obsolete with future releases for some time.

Variants and derived gamesAll at Sea is an adaptation of the rules for naval conflicts. The official rules were a modified version of the Warhammer Boat rules, adapted by Nick Davis and first presented in Games Workshop's White Dwarf magazine (US issue 295). The game's mechanics centred on boarding parties, with options for ramming actions and naval artillery in the form of ballistae and other siege engines. Model ships are built by hobbyists, just as normal miniature terrain, such as "great ships" of Pelargir, cogs of Dol Amroth and Corsair galleys.

Game systems
The standard game is played with two or more armies on a board generally 4 feet long and 4 feet wide (16 square feet, or 1.486 square meters), usually deployed within 6 inches of opposite board edges. Similar to Warhammer Fantasy, the game uses a "points-system" to assign values to each miniature, allowing players to ensure that their armies are evenly matched. The game is primarily a skirmish game, but can be played in varying scale:
Scenario - These are based on an event in the book or film, and the armies are predetermined and fought using Special Scenario-specific Rules.
Points Match - These are played between two forces of equal size, generally of 500 Points each (which is usually no more than 50 miniatures per side).
War Party - This is a stricter form of the Points Match, using forces of no more than 250 Points.
Battle Company - This is an experience-based system which is played out with no more than 25 miniatures.

The turn-system game was played using four phases originally, but is now played using five under the current rules:
Priority Phase - The players roll dice to see who gets to take their Turn first.
Move Phase - The players move their miniatures (to a maximum distance that is usually 6 inches). "Magic" (e.g. "Compel") is also used during this phase.
Shoot Phase - Missile-armed miniatures can shoot.
Fight Phase - Dice are rolled for each group of miniatures in base contact with each other to see which wins the combat.
End Phase - Reinforcements arrive, as well as general book-keeping

While the game is designed usually for play by only two players (as the force lists are divided into "Good" and "Evil"), very large battles (generally with more than 100 models each side) become easier to manage with multiple players working together on teams.

Troop types

There are two types of troops: Warriors and Heroes. Heroes have characteristics which set them apart from the Warriors they lead, and can be named or unnamed characters: Aragorn, Frodo, Captains, etc. Warriors are the core of the army: Warriors of Harad, Riders of Rohan, Men of Gondor, etc. Each army must be either Good or Evil, and can only include miniatures from that side (each model is named in the rules as being either Good or Evil).

As Tolkien's world is very rich in detail, players generally prefer to base their armies around one of the following themes:

The Free Peoples (Good)
The Fellowship of the Ring (Good) – Most scenario-based games require at least one member of the Fellowship. Whilst not a real army, they are effective as a skirmish force, due to their high points-values and limited numbers.
Elves (Good) – The Quendi are the oldest of the races of Middle-earth, and the majority of armies are either Wood Elves, High Elves or Galadhrim, often allied with Men of Númenor from the Last Alliance. Individually, Elf Warriors are among the most powerful and bravest of available races, with high Courage and Fight values. Also Elven armies have the best archers in the game, and are also notable for their potent powers of healing and foresight among Heroes such as Galadriel and Elrond. In earlier editions of the rules, Games Workshop kept the two kinds of Elves separate, and although the One Rulebook merges the two "races", they are most often kept separated into the two main themes:.  The Galadhrim are the most developed of the three elven kinds, they have Galadrim warriors including spearmen, archers and warriors with elven blades/glaives, cavalry in the form of Galadrim Knights (which can be archers), and the elite Guards of the Galadrim Court led by a newer elven hero, Rumil, kinsmen of Haldir and includes the heroes; Galadriel, Celeborn, Haldir and Rumil.
Elven Havens – The Elves of Eriador are considered the "High Elves" of the Last Alliance, and are not commonly seen in Third Age games. Their powerful Heroes include Gil-galad and Elrond, with the latter sometimes used outside the Second Age.
Woodland Realms - Originally, the Wood Elves were limited to a small range of metal miniatures, but with the release of The Fall of the Necromancer Supplement, a boxed set of plastics was released. Wood Elves include the Lothlórien Elves (also known as Haldir's Elves) as their elite troops, but the bulk of their armies consist of the Taurdirim of Mirkwood. These armies can also include the members of the White Council, and Ents such as Treebeard.
Gondor (Good) – The Kingdom of the White Tree has the widest range of warriors and heroes available. It can be divided into three main themes: Minas Tirith, Ithilien and the Fiefdoms of Gondor. Minas Tirith's key strength is in its armoured infantry, but it also has available mounted knights and the finest siege engines in the game: trebuchets and "bolt throwers". Minas Tirith armies often include elements from Ithilien armies, which has accurate archers. The fiefdoms represent three main forces: Dol Amroth, Lossarnach and Lamedon. Dol Amroth boasts heavy cavalry and pikemen (the only such available to Good armies) and courageous warriors, led by Imrahil. In addition, fiefdom players can also choose to field Forlong the Fat and Angbor the Fearless alongside their warriors. The fiefdoms usually only combined with Minas Tirith in a Battle of the Pelennor Fields theme. A very small number of dedicated players also build their own ships of Pelargir or Dol Amroth out of wood and other materials. Gondor is rarely allied with any armies other than Rohan. Some of its less common themes include:
Númenor – Númenor is one of the smaller good armies related to Gondor, representing also the Númenórean Realms in Exile (i.e. the Arnor and Gondor of the Second Age). Whilst it could be considered part of Gondor, it is only really used in Scenarios set in the Second Age (although sometimes its warriors can be used to represent Wardens of Pelargir). Númenor has a relatively limited range of warriors, but they are amongst the best warriors in the game, having access to the mighty heroes Isildur and Elendil. However, a note in the rulebook bans Númenórean armies to be used outside Second Age scenarios, so they are rarely seen in battle. Númenor is most frequently used with Elves, in Last Alliance-themed armies.
Army of the Dead – Perhaps the smallest Good army available, the Army of the Dead offers only one Hero and one Warrior type and one Cavalry type. They were accidentally omitted from the One Rulebook, so their rules can be downloaded through the Games Workshop website. They are usually allied with Gondor or Dúnedain, and led by Aragorn and the King of the Dead for a Pelennor Fields theme.

Rohan (Good) – Armies of the Riddermark tend to focus on light cavalry, which are its core unit (though Rohan infantry are often used in Helm's Deep scenarios). These are armed with throwing spears, unique to Rohan, bows and shields. Earlier editions of the rules made these especially powerful, but the current edition has balanced the game by increasing the points cost. On the other hand, Rohan still has Royal Guard and medium heroes such as Éomer and Háma; in addition, it has benefited from release of Eorl the Young, and a number of new releases to the Rohan range such as Erkenbrand were included in the more recent The Two Towers Supplement.
Dwarves (Good) – Although the Dwarves move an inch slower than the average man-sized warrior (making them easy to outmanoeuvre), their powerful bows and the highest defence in the game can make them a hard opponent. Their elite warriors are the Khazad Guard, and they have powerful heroes such as Gimli, Dáin and Balin. With the Khazad-Dûm Supplement, Vault Wardens, Iron Guard and Dwarf Ballistae were introduced, along with the tactics such as the "wall", "rock" and "flying axe" formations. They make few alliances, and even then usually only with Men of Dale.
Hobbits (Good) – Armies of the Shire are more oriented around skirmishes, as points-wise they have the most inexpensive warriors and heroes in the game. Their archers are unmatched by all but the Elves, but their Hobbit militia are the slowest and weakest warriors in the game. Aside from the Fellowship of the Ring, they never ally with other armies because of their fear of the outside world. Their heroes include Frodo of the Nine Fingers and Samwise Gamgee.
Dúnedain and Arnor (Good) – All Dúnedain and Rangers of the North are Heroes, making them expensive and rarely used. They are the prime example of an army that was excluded from the films, but was well-adapted by Games Workshop in a way that fit in with both the style of the films and their original mention in the books. Their main named Heroes are Aragorn and Halbarad, who are often allied with Gildor Inglorion and the Elves of Rivendell, or indirectly with Hobbits in some Scenarios. In the One Rulebook, the Dúnedain are classed in the same section as Tom Bombadil and Goldberry, though Tom and Goldberry are not allies but Scenario-specific characters from the Barrow-downs. They were expanded in the supplement, The Ruin of Arnor, allowing players to field Arnorian infantry, as well as heroes such as King Arvedui and Malbeth the Seer. Another common theme for the Dúnedain is the Grey Company.
Wildmen of Drúadan (Good) – Whilst the Drúedain are never described in battle, in the book their leader Ghân-buri-Ghân aids Théoden's army on their way through Drúadan Forest. They were eventually released alongside the updated "Return of the King" supplement.
The Wanderers in the Wild (Good) – The Wanderers in the wild are individuals that travel Middle-earth, for several purposes, be it exploring or protecting others. They include popular characters such as Glorfindel and Sméagol, but also characters invented by Games Workshop, like Múrin and Drár. They can ally with most armies. Other related smaller armies include:
Eagles of the Misty Mountains, led by Gwaihir, and usually allied with Gondor or The Elves.
Ents are similar in that they are expensive, rarely used warriors.
The Beornings, led by Grimbeorn, have also been announced in Legions of Middle-earth.
The Wizards (Good) – The Wizards represent the Istari that fought for the Free Peoples during the Third Age. In addition to the more obvious Gandalf and Radagast, there is also a "good" Saruman from the time of the White Council. Radagast usually allies with the Dwarves or the Woodland Realms, while Gandalf usually allies with Rohan, Gondor or the Fellowship.

The Forces of Darkness (Evil)
Angmar (Evil) – The dark land of Angmar is built on the ruins of the Lost Kingdom of Arnor, terrorised by Nazgûl and Spectres. Its army had no official rules until early 2007, except for the Ringwraiths and Barrow-wights (which are nonetheless potent magic-users) and wild Wargs, led by Warg chieftains. It never allies with other armies, although Orcs and Goblins are sometimes included in it. Angmar received official rules in The Ruin of Arnor Supplement, including Games Workshop's invented Hill Troll Chieftain "Buhrdûr". The earlier rules are still available to use in friendly games on Games Workshop's website.
Moria (Evil) – The subterranean realm of Khazad-dûm used to be infested by the Dwarves, but it was liberated by Evil. Now it is populated with Goblins and Cave Trolls, and more frightening creatures such as the Balrog are the centrepiece of Moria forces. Goblins are weak but inexpensive to field, making them numerous in games, and can be strengthened by Goblin Drums and Goblin Shamans. Moria allies with Isengard in the books and Games Workshop have also added Angmar, Dol Guldur, and Barad-dûr, and the Nazgûl to their allies list.
Isengard (Evil) - The Army of the White Hand is a reliable and varied force to collect, featuring a number of unique warrior and siege options, such as crossbows (the most powerful bows in the game), pikes and a primitive form of explosive. Typical Isengard armies feature the Uruk-hai pikeblock, though they are often supported by light infantry such as Uruk-hai scouts, medium cavalry in the form of Wargs, or spellcasters in the form of Uruk Shamans or even Saruman himself. Games Workshop has also been criticised for The Two Towers Supplement allowing Isengard the option of a White Mountains Troll. Isengard only ever allies with Moria, the Nazgûl and Dunland, which rarely fights on its own and is almost always classed under Isengard anyway. Players can also choose to represent Saruman's army after the fall of Isengard, complete with Rogues: the upcoming Bill Ferny miniature adds some depth to such a force.

Mordor (Evil) – Legions of the Eye are made up of various warrior types. Their core unit is the Orc warrior on foot, bolstered by Morannon Orcs and Mordor Uruk-hai. They also offer Siege Catapults and ballistae with mantlets, led by Gothmog; these siege engines are often operated by Mordor Trolls, which can also be used as shock troops. Mordor armies can field a variety of troops to diversify their armies, including Morgul Knights and Black Numénórean Warriors, Orc Trackers, which provide a rare form of accurate archery, Morgul Stalkers, Warg Riders and even Shelob. However, the most dreaded element of Mordor armies is the Ringwraith on Fell-Beast, which, as a flying creature, can move around the board unimpeded and strike with dark magic. Mordor can be allied with any Evil army except Angmar or Isengard. Sauron is only ever fielded in person in campaigns set around the Last Alliance (or in Dol Guldur armies).
The Nazgûl (Evil) – Although primarily Mordor-themed, the Nine were sent all over Middle-earth, and have been classified as a separate army list accordingly. The Nazgûl consist of the Witch-king of Angmar, Khamûl the Easterling and seven unnamed Ringwraiths, although Games Workshop has created titles to differentiate each: The Tainted, the Undying, the Shadow Lord, the Dark Marshal, the Betrayer, the Knight of Umbar and the Dwimmerlaik.
Dol Guldur (Evil) – Dol Guldur armies form Sauron's troops from the time that he was hiding in Southern Mirkwood, and went under the name of the "Necromancer". There are two general themes by which players usually construct their armies. The first, and perhaps most obvious, is based around the fortress garrison of Dol Guldur, containing Sauron himself as the Necromancer, backed up by Castellans of Dol Guldur, and usually Orcs and the occasional Troll. The other way is actually more of a general evil army of Mirkwood, containing Giant Spiders led by the "Spider Queen". Both armies can include swarms of Giant Bats, and can be allied. Other themes include Spiders allied with wild Wargs to form an army of wild creatures, or allied with Moria to represent a force from the Mountains of Mirkwood. Their biggest enemy are the Elves - the Taurdirim and the Galadhrim.
Harad (Evil) – The lands to the south are only briefly mentioned by Tolkien, and much of its forces and place-names have been invented by Games Workshop or Weta. Harad offers warriors and light cavalry that are inexpensive to field, and have poison arrows increasing their effectiveness against armoured warriors. Their most devastating miniature, however, is the Mûmak: at one point the largest plastic Games Workshop miniature ever (it has since been surpassed in size), which in the game can trample enemy foot soldiers. Their invented heroes include Suladan and the hasharin. Players wanting to add variety can add the Mahûd of Far Harad, which include cavalry on camels, warriors with blowpipes and even Halftrolls.
Corsairs (Evil) – Another alternative to the usual Harad army is that of Umbar, which can use Harad Warriors but also involves corsairs. Until recently Corsairs were unavailable, and only existed as player-made conversions. However, with the release of the Harad sourcebook, Games Workshop released some new Corsair miniatures; including metal Arbalesters and a new character: Dalamyr, Fleetmaster of Umbar. Based on Legions of Middle Earth, a Corsair War Machine will be released in the future along with "Corsair Reavers", most likely to be elite Warriors.
Easterlings (Evil) – In previous forms of the rules, the Easterlings were pitifully weak, offering only three warrior types cast in metal, and not even appearing until the third edition of the rules. However, their range has been increased enormously with the release of A Shadow in the East. Games Workshop's Easterlings represent the Balchoth, and have been based on a combination of imagery from the New Line films and history of the Sassanid Empire. They offer the unique phalanx (the first army to have pikes since Isengard), and are the only Evil army to feature heavy cavalry, referred to as "kataphracts". They frequently ally with Khand or Mordor. As of Legions of Middle-earth, the Easterlings were given a King unit of their own, a Dragon Guard unit that the model for was not made until the War of the Ring battle game was released (entitled "Dragon Knight". (Dragon Knights and Dragon Guards may not be the same troops. They also received a Siege Bow machine from Legions of Middle-earth, and War of the Ring gave them a Shaman unit called "Easterling War Priests", and a battlefield musician, the "Easterling Drummers". They were given a Named Hero "Amdûr, Lord of Blades". He and the Dragon Knights have a melee skill of 7, which is an indicator that Games-Workshop's Easterlings are based on both the Achaemenid and Sassanid Persians, whereas Tolkien's seem to be based on mostly the Achaemenid and Parthian ones (hence the "bowmen upon horses"). They are not given the Chariots they had in the books, but they can be given chariots by putting an Easterling footman miniature into a Persian War Chariot miniature from another company, and use the Khandish Chariot rules.
Khand (Evil) – Tolkien wrote even less about Khand than he did about Harad, though we know that the only thing implied about them is that the armour they wore covered - literally - their entire bodies ("Variags who hated the sun"), and that their weapons may be their own design of Haradrim and Easterling weapons. Games Workshop has based their Variags of Khand on the Mongols and the Japanese, featuring sashimonos and the unique chariots, despite the Easterlings being the only culture in Middle-earth with chariots in Tolkien's writings. It was suggested that the Gondorians were unaware of the lands further east, and thus the names of the Variags and Wainriders had been mixed-up. Khand allies with the Easterlings (and the Haradrim) frequently.
Monsters of Middle-earth (Evil) – This applies to individual models that do not fit into other armies; in this case, the five creatures that each "represents a fantasy archetype - stone giant, dragon, cave drake and fire demon (the Balrog)." The fifth was a purely Games Workshop creation: "Gûlavhar, the Terror of Arnor" - a "vampire" demon of Morgoth, but lesser than a Balrog. The Monsters of Middle-earth can ally with most evil forces.

Additional characters
Games Workshop has taken the liberty to fill in gaps in Tolkien's works by creating new heroes and units alike. Some are heavily criticized, such as the Isengard Troll, having been described as "not thematically correct"; whilst others have been popular additions.

Cirion – Named after the steward of Gondor that gave Rohan to Eorl the Young, Game Workshop's interpretation of Cirion is the lieutenant of Amon Barad.
Mardin – Mardin is King Durin's life ward. Normally the role of the king's personal protector is offered to a member of the Khazad Guard, but Mardin, a veteran Vault Warden, has proven his level head and strong arm in many a battle and there is no more dependable companion to be found.
Múrin and Drár – In the Third Age, few Dwarves are prone to wanderlust. Murin and Drar are two exceptions to this rule, having travelled far and wide beyond their home in the Iron Hills.
Durbûrz, Goblin King of Moria – The Goblin King of Moria, has ruled the underground lands for many years with an iron fist of brutality and strength. Feared mightily (and rightly so) by his goblin subjects. While not the cleverest of Goblins, he is as fiercely territorial as the rest and reacts to his realm's invasion by raising a powerful army to oppose Balin and his Dwarves. Durbûrz is believed to be an interpretation of a descendant of the Great Goblin. In The Lord of the Rings: The Battle for Middle-earth II by EA Games, a similar character named Gorkil The Goblin King appears; this may or may not be an interpretation of the same character.
Buhrdûr, Hill Troll Chieftain – He is the leader of the Trolls that were part of The Ruin of Arnor. While the troll himself is an actual character in Tolkien's Lore, Buhrdûr is the name Games-Workshop writers identified him as. Buhrdûr is a creature of pure benevolence, spawned in the darkest caves of the Misty Mountains. Possessing cunning over and above that usually encountered in others of his Trollish kind, Buhrdûr has gathered to him all manner of fell beings. In The Rise of the Witch-king by EA Games, a similar character named Rogash appears; this may or may not be an interpretation of the same character.
Vraskû – Vraskû commands the legions of the White Hand Scout Uruk-hai. A cunning and resourceful leader, Vraskû is utterly ruthless and heedless of the lives of his followers.
Keiseimu, Ravager of Ithilien – The Khandish named hero. So far, all that is known about him is his name and the fact that he can be given a chariot to ride to battle.  He may need to use a King profile with a Might, Will, and Fate of 3, 1, and 1; and a Courage of 4 in the Skirmish game. As for War of the Ring, he may need to use the Khandish King profile with a Melee skill of 6
Suladân, the Serpent Lord – In truth, Suladan's name passed out of use long ago when he took the name of a revered hero at the time he claimed leadership of his tribe. Since then the name of the Serpent Lord has once more become a famous one throughout Harad, and his own legend grows with each victory. A Haradrim chief analogous to one whom Théoden faces at the Battle of the Pelennor Fields. Tolkien left him unnamed; his name and title are invented by Games Workshop although his name is likely an altered form of Saladin; the Muslim leader during the Third Crusade.
Hâsharin – The despotic lords who rule Harad exercise their will through the Hasharii assassins, an order founded in Sauron's name. To question or contradict the will of a Hasharin leads to death, whether by public execution or through the quiet application of their murderous skills. On the battlefield, the Hasharii act as assassins, seeking out enemy leaders and slaying them with poisoned blades. The Hâsharin seem to be a dark parody of the infamous Hashshashin order from the middle-east and southern Asia.
Dalamyr, Fleetmaster of Umbar – A notorious figure in the land of Harad, Dalamyr has been one of the foremost fleetmasters for many long years.
Gûlavhar, the Terror of Arnor – Gûlavhar is a being from an earlier time that should have perished long ago - a winged demon with a hunger for blood. How he came to survive the terrible wars against Morgoth will never be known, yet survive he did, sleeping through countless centuries.
Drûzhag, the Beastcaller – Drûzhag is vile, even by the standards of other Goblins - so much so that he was exiled long ago from Durbûrz's squalid kingdom of Moria. Yet Drûzhag did not perish in the wilderland. He prospered, and learnt how to bend to his will all manner of dark beasts.
The Shadow Lord – The Shadow Lord was once the king of a small and insignificant kingdom. When Sauron offered him one of the Nine Rings, the promise of its power proved irresistible. Now, his physical being all but gone, and his will enslaved to Sauron, the Shadow Lord wears his dark pride like a cloak, blotting the sun from the sky and dimming the sight of his foes. The Shadow Lord is a name applied to one of the nine Ringwraiths, representing the aspect of their dimming, shadowy influence on their environment. In-game, The Shadow Lord shrouds his allies in darkness, making it more difficult to fight against them.
The Dark Marshal – In the centuries since the Dark Marshal and his fellow kings became Ringwraiths, he has become even more sadistic and malicious. The most black-hearted and unrelentingly cruel of all the Nazgûl, his name is a byword for misery and death. Where the Dark Marshal passes, Evil creatures fight harder, fearful of their lives whilst Good warriors feel the icy touch of death upon their hearts. The Dark Marshall represents another one of the unnamed Ringwraiths, embodying their more martial side, (pun not intended,) and brings it to bear that Sauron's soldiers fear his commanders far more than the enemy they fight.
The Undying – The Undying has endured long where others have fallen. He is said to be the oldest of the Ringwraiths, and the last to succumb to the wasting influences of the Rings of Power. Through an obsessive mastery of evil magics, the Undying has learnt to draw sustenance from the magics of others, fortifying himself with the magical energy that flows around him. Tolkien repeatedly wrote of the Nazgûl as being powerful sorcerers, and The Undying was added into the game in the wake of those statements. His model is unique, in that he carries a staff and not a sword.
The Tainted – Where the other Nazgûl were slowly swallowed by the taint of their rings, the Tainted gave himself wholly and willingly to Sauron. Now all natural things rebel in his presence, vegetation withers, animals sicken and bold warriors cower. He is an abomination whose merest presence is poison to life, honour and hope. The Tainted is one of the Nazgûl, representing their withering, abhorrent nature. His mounted model is built to look as though his horse were sickened and dying by merely being near him.
The Betrayer – A Nazgûl who was cursed long ago for yielding the Southlands to Sauron's rule, the Betrayer is driven by malice and self-hatred that knows no bounds. Of all the Nazgûl, the Betrayer is amongst the lowest of Sauron's lieutenants, for even the Dark Lord is leery of placing faith in one who betrayed his kin so readily. The Betrayer is another addition to the nine Ringwraiths by Games Workshop, depicted wearing Haradrim armour and a turban around his hood, although his weapon is a western longsword, instead of a Southron's weapon.
The Knight of Umbar – Like all of the Nazgûl, the Knight of Umbar's past is shrouded in mystery. If the rumours pertaining to him hold any truth, he was once one of the great Númenórean kings who ruled the Southlands prior to the days of the Last Alliance. He was added to close the circle with the seven non-canonically named Nazgûl, probably representing the leader of the Black Númenóreans who settled in southern Middle-earth, founding the port-city of Umbar.
The Dwimmerlaik – The Dwimmerlaik is possibly the most mysterious of all the Nazgûl, for scant record of his past deeds exist in the tomes of the Wise. Yet in Rohan, this particular Ringwraith is feared beyond all others, for he has been a blight upon that realm for centuries untold, directing the Dark Lord's minions against the Sons of Eorl
Kârdush, the Firecaller – Orc Shamans are a peculiar breed who practice a primitive and brutish form of sorcery. The Wise believe Kârdush of Barad-dûr to have been schooled in more learned sorceries by one of the Nazgûl - doubtless for the Ringwraith's own twisted ends, though the Orc surely remains ignorant of it.
Amdur, Lord of Blades – The Lord of Blades leads the Easterling Dragon Knights, and is the most skilled of that noble order. Amdûr has already carved a fearsome reputation in the lands beyond Mordor, and now has come to test his skills on the blood-soaked Pelennor.
The Golden King of Harad – A figure depicted being carried on a litter and wearing a golden mask and turban. Likely added into the game to give another edge to the Haradrim. He is protected by a unit of Abrakhân guard; Abrakhân may be a non-canonical kingdom or Harad, which was said to have been made of many realms.
Black Guard of Barad-dûr – The Black Guard of Barad-dûr are considered the most fearsome of all the Orc breeds to march in Sauron's armies. Not only are the warriors of the Black Guard much stronger than ordinary orcs, they are led by Captains whose loyalty to Sauron renders them almost insensate to fear. These troops are considered a Games-Workshop creation.
Thrydan Wolfsbane – Thrydan Wolfsbane is the first true warchief of Dunland in centuries. A giant of a man, he leads through brute force rather than deftness of tongue and blade, yet he has shown cunning enough to forge an alliance with Saruman.

Online community

Prior to the closure of Games Workshop's official forum in November 2006, the site had 3000 forum posts per day and well over 300,000 registered users. Since then, the online community has moved onto a large number of unofficial websites and forums for Lord of the Rings players, many of which were already in existence before the closure of Games Workshop's forums: these include "The Last Alliance", with over 6400 registered members (rebuilt in 2009 due to the host deleting their server for financial reasons), "The One-Ring", with over 5000, and "The Palantir''", with over 2400 members. Collectively, the members of these websites have produced high-quality articles for the public, namely on The One-Ring, whose acceptance standards are very high, in greater quantity than on the official site, and White Dwarf has commented on the community as having a "huge wealth of material".

On 1 June 2005, Games Workshop launched their annual UK-based Worldwide Campaign under the name "The War of the Ring Online Campaign", featuring The Lord of the Rings for the first time. The campaign was deemed "a fantastic rollercoaster", with 3007 registered participants. Games Workshop also introduced the "Wrath of Umbar Roadshow", with custom-built Corsair models and gaming boards being brought to various cities in the United Kingdom. When the campaign formally ended on 8 September, Good emerged the victor. The combined total of the 14 weeks was 27,239 recorded wargames. The forum closed shortly after, giving way to a smaller Canada-based campaign with the same name.

Hobby websites have been key in organising sides in the Worldwide Campaigns, and indeed in creating their own campaigns and competitions, such as the "Campaign of LoTRs", a collaboration between the two websites "The Dark Council" and "Cheeseweb".

Another notable side of the community is the influence of its reaction to the company's products: many Tolkien purists, for example, reacted against the company's rendition of the Swan Knights of Dol Amroth, with some choosing to convert their own, impacting the hobby and the sales of the products. When Games Workshop subsequently showed the planned release of the Men-at-Arms of Dol Amroth, it was suggested that they had taken the response of the community into account.

Footnotes

References

External links 
Official Games Workshop Lord of the Rings website